Karna Manga is a village in the commune of Mbe in the Adamawa Region of Cameroon. It is located on the road from Ngaoundéré to Karna and Garoua

Population 
In 1967, the settlement contained 571 inhabitants, mostly  At the time of the 2005 census, there were 848 people in the village.

Infrastructure 
Karna Manga has a school, a health centre, and a Catholic mission.

References

Bibliography
 Jean Boutrais, 1993, Peuples et cultures de l'Adamaoua (Cameroun) : actes du colloque de Ngaoundéré du 14 au 16 janvier 1992, Paris : Éd. de l'ORSTOM u.a.
 Dictionnaire des villages de l'Adamaoua, ONAREST, Yaoundé, October 1974, 133 p.
 Tomas Sundnes Drønen, Communication and conversion in northern Cameroon: the Dii people and Norwegian missionaries, 1934-1960, Brill, Leiden, Boston, 2009, 234 p.

External links
 Mbe, on the website Communes et villes unies du Cameroun (CVUC)
 Climat : Karna Manga (climate-data.org)

Populated places in Adamawa Region